At the 1960 Summer Olympics in Rome, seven events in sprint canoe racing were contested at Lake Albano. Four changes were done to the program. First, the 10000 metre events that were raced from 1936 to 1956 were permanently dropped from the Olympic program, leaving all races at the 500 metre and 1000 metre distances. Second, the women's K-2 500 m event was added to the program, as was a men's K-1 4 × 500 m relay event (though for these games). Third, event timing in 1/100ths of a second at these games. Fourth, a repechage system was introduced that was used to the 1996 games in Atlanta at Lake Lanier.

Medal table

Medal summary

Men's events

Women's events

References
1960 Summer Olympics official report Volume 2, Part 1. pp. 248–70.
 

 
1960 Summer Olympics events
1960